Arasu Engineering College is an engineering college located in Kumbakonam, Tamil Nadu, India. The college has been approved by the All India Council for Technical Education and is affiliated to Anna University of Technology, Chennai.This college is accredited by "National assessment and accreditation council".

History
Arasu Engineering College was established by Sri Thirunavukkarasu Dhanalakshmi Educational and Charitable Trust in 2000. It was registered as a public charitable trust in the year 2000 to serve the society. The trust is doing yeomen service in the field of Technical Education and Research.

Arasu Engineering College offers programmes that have been approved by All India Council for Technical Education with three programmes at the Under Graduate level in the year 2001-2002. The college at present offers Eight Under Graduate Programmes and Three Post Graduate Programmes

Courses offered

UG Courses

 B.E Computer science and engineering
 B.E Electronics & Communication Engineering
 B.E Electrical & Electronics Engineering
 B.E Civil Engineering
 B.E Mechanical Engineering
 B.E Auto mobile Engineering
 B.E Agricultural Engineering
 B.E Bio medical Engineering

References

Engineering colleges in Tamil Nadu
Colleges affiliated to Anna University
Education in Thanjavur district
Educational institutions established in 2000
2000 establishments in Tamil Nadu
Kumbakonam